Kwango is a province of the Democratic Republic of the Congo. It's one of the 21 provinces created in the 2015 repartitioning.  Kwango, Kwilu, and Mai-Ndombe provinces are the result of the dismemberment of the former Bandundu province.  Kwango was formed from the Kwango district whose town of Kenge was elevated to capital city of the province.

The province takes its name from the Kwango River, a tributary of the Kasai River that defines part of the international boundary between the DRC and Angola.

Towns/territories

The capital of Kwango district is Kenge.
Other towns include Popokabaka, Feshi, Kasongo Lunda, Lusanga and Kahemba.
The province is in the southwest of the DRC, bordering Angola to the south.
Territories are:
 Feshi
 Kahemba
 Kasongo Lunda
 Kenge
 Popokabaka

History 

Kwango previously existed as a province from 1962 to 1966.
Presidents (from 1965, governors)
23 September 1962 – 11 November 1962 Albert Delvaux (fl. 1918)
 November 1962 Emmanuel Mayamba
 1962 – April 1963 Alphonse Pashi
 August 1963 – April 1964 Pierre Masikita (1st time)
 April 1964 – 30 September 1964 Belunda Kavunzu
 30 September 1964 –24 August 1965 Joseph Kulumba
 24 August 1965 – 25 April 1966 Pierre Masikita (2nd time)

From 1966 to 2015, Kwango was administered as a district as part of Bandundu Province. Kwango returned to full provincial status with its capital of Kenge on 18 July 2015.

References

 
Provinces of the Democratic Republic of the Congo